Isla Gonzalo  is a subantarctic island, uninhabited except for a weather and research station operated by the Chilean Navy. The archipelago lies in the Drake Passage between the continents of South America and Antarctica. It is an important breeding site for black-browed (over 6000 pairs) and grey-headed (over 4000 pairs) albatrosses, as well as for southern giant petrels.

See also
 List of islands of Chile
 List of Antarctic and sub-Antarctic islands
 List of fjords, channels, sounds and straits of Chile

References

External links
 Islands of Chile @ United Nations Environment Programme 
 World island information @ WorldIslandInfo.com
 South America Island High Points above 1000 meters
 United States Hydrographic Office, South America Pilot (1916)

Uninhabited islands of Chile
Islands of Magallanes Region
Diego Ramírez Islands
Seabird colonies